The Arats ( — labourer, folk) are a social ethnic community of Mongolian herdsmen. They reside in Mongolia and China. The Arats' main activity is cattle herding. Before the Revolution of 1921, the Arats composed 92.5% of Mongolia's population and possessed 50.5% of the nation's livestock. The Arats of China are considered a part of the population of Inner Mongolia, Xinjiang, and Qinghai provinces. Some peasants of the Tyva Republic in Russia are also called Arats.

References 
 Владимиров Б.Я. Общественный строй монголов. Ленинград, 1934.
 Нацокдоржи Ш. Из истории аратского движения во Внешней Монголии, Москва, 1958.

Mongolian tribes and clans